Wissahickon may refer to the following in the U.S. state of Pennsylvania:

Wissahickon, Philadelphia, a section or neighborhood of Philadelphia
Wissahickon Creek, a tributary of the Schuylkill River
Wissahickon Memorial Bridge, spans the above creek in Philadelphia
Wissahickon Formation, a mapped bedrock unit in Pennsylvania, New Jersey, and Delaware
Wissahickon High School, in the borough of Ambler
Wissahickon (house), a historic apartment building in Philadelphia
Wissahickon School District, in Montgomery County
Wissahickon (SEPTA station), a passenger rail station in Northwest Philadelphia
Wissahickon Skating Club, a non-profit skating club in the Chestnut Hill section of Philadelphia
Wissahickon Trail, a suburban trail
Wissahickon Valley Park, in Fairmount Park, Philadelphia
USRC Wissahickon (1904), one of two Winnisimmet-class harbor tugs
Saul High School of Agricultural Sciences, formerly known as the Wissahickon Farm School

See also
USS Wissahickon, disambiguation